Oxotrichlorobis(triphenylphosphine)rhenium(V) is the chemical compound with the formula ReOCl3(PPh3)2.  This yellow, air-stable solid is a precursor to a variety of other rhenium complexes. In this diamagnetic compound, Re has an octahedral coordination environment with one oxo, three chloro and two mutually trans triphenylphosphine ligands. The oxidation state of rhenium is +5 and its configuration is d2.

Synthesis
ReOCl3(PPh3)2 is commercially available, but it is readily synthesized by reaction of perrhenic acid with triphenylphosphine in a mixture of hydrochloric acid and acetic acid.  In this reaction, Re(VII) is reduced to Re(V), and triphenylphosphine is oxidized to its oxide.  
 HReO4  +  3 HCl  +  3 PPh3  →   ReOCl3(PPh3)2  +  Ph3PO  +  2 H2O
The required perrhenic acid solution can be prepared in situ from rhenium(VII) oxide.

Uses
ReOCl3(PPh3)2 is a precursor to a variety of other oxo-, nitridio, and hydrido complexes.  It converts to ReH7(PPh3)2 by a treatment with LiAlH4.

ReOCl3(PPh3)2 catalyzes the selective oxidation of secondary alcohols by DMSO, producing the corresponding ketals.

References

Rhenium compounds
Chloro complexes
Triphenylphosphine complexes